Flatten may refer to:

 Flat-ten engine, an engine with two banks of five opposing cylinders each
 Svein Flåtten, Norwegian politician
 Mount Flatten, mountain in the animated television series The Rocky and Bullwinkle Show
 Flattening, the compression of a circle or sphere into an ellipse or an ellipsoid
 Flattening of affect, loss or lack of emotional expressiveness
 Flattening the curve, a technique to slow spread of a pathogen in order to minimize peak demand on healthcare resources
 Regrading, changing the slope or grade of land; levelling 
 Flat-file database, a database file format where there are no structures for indexing or recognizing relationships between records; flattened

See also 
 
 
 Flat (disambiguation)